Marina Dubinina  (born ) is a retired Ukrainian female volleyball player. She was part of the Ukraine women's national volleyball team.

She participated in the 1994 FIVB Volleyball Women's World Championship. On club level she played with Alcoreca.

Clubs
 Alcoreca (1994)

References

External links 
 Marina Dubinina // women.volleybox.net
 Дубиніна Марина Євгенівна // Енциклопедія сучасної України

1969 births
Living people
Ukrainian women's volleyball players
Place of birth missing (living people)